Masaji Ishikawa or Do Changsun is a North Korean defector and author on Zainichi heritage. Ishikawa was thirteen years old when he moved from Japan to North Korea in 1960. His father was Zainichi Korean and his mother was  Japanese. Ishikawa later defected from North Korea in 1996 via the Yalu river, leaving behind three children and a spouse. The Japanese government assisted him in leaving China. In 2003, he was working as a security guard.

Memoir
In 2000, Ishikawa published his memoirs in Japan under the title  and the nom de plume . They were translated into English in 2017 under the title A River in Darkness. Ishikawa's memoirs are published in Korean under his Korean name and the title . The book was translated into Persian in 2020. The part of the book focused on the river crossing was published in Literary Hub.

Notes

References

North Korean defectors

1947 births
Living people
Zainichi Korean people
People from Kawasaki, Kanagawa